Otto Walzhofer (21 June 1926 – 22 September 2000) was an Austrian retired footballer and coach.

References

External links
 Sturm Archiv

1926 births
2000 deaths
Austrian footballers
Austria international footballers
Association football forwards
Austrian football managers
First Vienna FC players
LASK players
First Vienna FC managers